Théo Bongonda Mbul'Ofeko Batomboat (born 20 November 1995) is a professional footballer who plays as a left winger for La Liga club Cádiz. Born in Belgium, he plays for the DR Congo national team.

Club career

Zulte Waregem
Born in Charleroi, Bongonda began his career in JMG Academy in 2008, aged 13. In January 2013, he joined Belgian Pro League team SV Zulte Waregem, initially assigned to the youth setup.

Bongonda made his professional debut on 25 September 2013, starting in a 2–1 away win against KFC VW Hamme, for the season's Belgian Cup. His league debut came on 15 December, coming on as a second half substitute in a 3–0 home win against Lierse SK.

Bongonda scored his first professional goal on 15 January 2014, netting his side's first in a 2–3 away loss against Cercle Brugge KSV. On 20 April 2014, he scored his first league goal, netting the first in a 3–2 away loss against KSC Lokeren.

Celta Vigo
On 9 January 2015, Bongonda signed a four-and-a-half-year contract with La Liga side Celta de Vigo. He made his debut in the competition on the 26th, coming on as a late substitute for Nemanja Radoja in a 2–1 away loss against Getafe CF.

Trabzonspor
On 15 June 2017, Bongonda joined Trabzonspor on a season-long loan deal with an option to buy. He however ended up being on the bench more than on the pitch.

Zulte Waregem
During the winter transfer window of the 2017–18 season, Bongonda rejoined Zulte-Waregem on loan. On 4 July 2018, he joined Essevee permanently on a four-year contract, until 30 June 2022.

Genk
Bongonda joined fellow Belgian First Division A club Genk in summer 2019 for a club-record fee.

Bongonda scored the game winner for Genk against Standard Liège in the Belgian Cup Final on 25 April 2021.

On 23 July 2021, Bongonda scored Genk's first goal in the 2021–22 Belgian First Division A season, securing a 1–1 draw against the same opponents.

Cádiz
On 26 August 2022, Bongonda returned to Spain after signing a four-year contract with Cádiz in the top tier.

International career
Bongonda was born in Belgium to a Congolese father and Belgian mother. He is a youth international for Belgium. In January 2022, Fifa accepted his eligibility join the DR Congo national team. He debuted for the DR Congo national team in a 1–0 friendly loss to Bahrain on 1 February 2022.

Career statistics

Honours
Genk
Belgian Cup: 2020–21

References

External links

1995 births
Living people
Sportspeople from Charleroi
Footballers from Hainaut (province)
Association football midfielders
Democratic Republic of the Congo footballers
Democratic Republic of the Congo international footballers
Belgian footballers
Belgium under-21 international footballers
Belgium youth international footballers
Belgian sportspeople of Democratic Republic of the Congo descent
Democratic Republic of the Congo people of Belgian descent
Association football wingers
Belgian Pro League players
S.V. Zulte Waregem players
K.R.C. Genk players
La Liga players
Süper Lig players
RC Celta de Vigo players
Cádiz CF players
Trabzonspor footballers
Belgian expatriate footballers
Belgian expatriate sportspeople in Spain
Belgian expatriate sportspeople in Turkey
Expatriate footballers in Spain
Expatriate footballers in Turkey
Black Belgian sportspeople